Oleksandr Holokolosov (Олександр Миколайович Голоколосов, Russian Romanization: Alexander Golokolosov) is an Odessa-native Soviet footballer and a Ukrainian football manager.

Holokolosov coached FC Sheriff Tiraspol until March 2002.

He also coached FC Vostok since July 2007.

References

1955 births
Living people
Soviet footballers
Ukrainian footballers
Ukrainian expatriate footballers
Expatriate footballers in Bulgaria
Ukrainian expatriate sportspeople in Bulgaria
FC Chornomorets Odesa players
FC Dnipro Cherkasy players
FC Elektrometalurh-NZF Nikopol players
MFC Mykolaiv players
FC Hoverla Uzhhorod players
FC Zimbru Chișinău players
FK Neftchi Farg'ona players
Ukrainian football managers
FC Hoverla Uzhhorod managers
FC Chornomorets Odesa managers
FC Tiraspol managers
FC Ivan Odesa managers
FC Sheriff Tiraspol managers
FC Nistru Otaci managers
Footballers from Odesa
Ukrainian Premier League managers
FC Dynamo Kirov players
FC Taganrog players
Soviet football managers
Ukrainian expatriate football managers
Expatriate football managers in Moldova
Expatriate football managers in Kazakhstan
Ukrainian expatriate sportspeople in Moldova
Ukrainian expatriate sportspeople in Kazakhstan
Association football forwards
FC Metallurg Lipetsk players
Moldovan Super Liga managers
FC Volga Ulyanovsk players